Anor is a commune in the Nord department in northern France.
It lies about forty kilometres (twenty-five miles) south-south-east of Maubeuge.

Population

Twin towns – sister cities

Anor is twinned with:
 Aken, Germany
 Gizałki, Poland
 Momignies, Belgium
 Příbram, Czech Republic

Heraldry

See also
Communes of the Nord department

References

Communes of Nord (French department)